is a Japanese shōjo comedy manga series written by Matsukoma and illustrated by Hashimoto, and published in Monthly Comic Gene since 2013.  A live-action television adaptation has been produced.

Media

Manga
Matsukoma and Hashimoto began publishing the manga in the August 2013 issue of Media Factory's shōjo magazine Monthly Comic Gene.  The series was based on a series of Twitter posts detailing the lives of real-life convenience store employees.  An audio drama CD was released in February 2015.

Volume list

TV drama
It was announced in the September issue of Monthly Comic Gene that the series would be adapted into a live-action television drama.  The series was written and directed by Yūichi Fukuda, and premiered on Yomiuri TV , Hulu, and crunchyroll starting on 1 January 2016. Shōtarō Mamiya played Tomoharu Nii and Kenji Urai played Matsukoma.

Reception
As of the September issue of Monthly Comic Gene, the series had over 1 million copies in print.

In a list of best-selling first volumes published in 2014, compiled by The Japan Publication Sales' Distribution Reform Group Comic Team, the series ranked number three.  It also ranked number three on a list of the top 15 manga series containing less than five volumes, based on a poll of 2,360 bookstore employees conducted by the online bookseller Honya Club. The series ranked fourth in the first Next Manga Award in the print manga category.

References

Comedy anime and manga
Shōjo manga
Media Factory manga
Kadokawa Dwango franchises
Television shows written by Yûichi Fukuda